William Powell (born 8 March 1985) is a British racing driver and businessman. He is the founder of Motus One a motorsport marketing company and a director of One Motorsport.  He races in the British Touring Car Championship for Autobrite Direct with JourneyHero. He formerly raced for the Brabham Motorsport team and won the 2021 British Endurance Championship in a McLaren GT3.

Sports marketing 
Powell's media career began working as a road tester for Autocar and Haymarket Media Group. He later worked for production company North One TV whose clients included FIA World Rally Championship, FIA Formula E Championship, and FIA Formula One. He also worked in performance vehicle marketing roles at Jaguar Land Rover and later became a Vice President at CSM, the motorsports marketing division of Chime Plc.

In 2016, Powell founded the motorsport marketing business Motus One. In 2018, Motus One Racing was added to the group adding a motorsport events and race team to the business.

Motor racing 
Powell was a BTCC driver for team Autobrite Direct with JourneyHero run by Team HARD in a Cupra Leon. He was formerly a factory driver for the motorsport division of Anglo-American sports car company Brabham Automotive.

He has raced in GT and sports car championships in the UK including F3, British Endurance Championship, GT Cup, Radicals, 24h Series and MR2 Championship.

He is qualified as a race coach by the Association of Racing Driver Schools (ARDS) and has coached customers for Mercedes-Benz AMG, Bentley, and Ford.

He drove the Brabham BT62 Competition in the marque’s return to racing at the Brands Hatch Into The Night Race in November 2019 alongside teammate David Brabham. The duo finished in first place with Powell setting fastest lap of the race.

In a disrupted 2020 motorsport season, Powell raced in the British Endurance Series and GT Cup in a Ginetta G55 GT4 with co-driver Dave Scaramanga for Motus One Racing. During the COVID-19 UK lockdown, Powell won multiple e-sports races in a virtual Brabham BT62.

In 2021, Powell won the British Endurance Series championship in a McLaren 650S GT3. In the same year, it was announced by Maximum Motorsport that Powell would drive its Hyundai i30N in the TCR UK touring car championship. He also tested for Team HARD in its Cupra Leon for the British Touring Car Championship.

He competed in six of the ten race weekends that made up the 2022 BTCC Championship in a CUPRA Leon and scored no points. He also competed in a partial season of the British Endurance Series and scored multiple podiums.

Racing record

Complete British Touring Car Championship results
(key) (Races in bold indicate pole position – 1 point awarded just in first race; races in italics indicate fastest lap – 1 point awarded all races; * signifies that driver led race for at least one lap – 1 point given all races)

References 

Living people
1985 births
British racing drivers